Michael Souther is a Canadian television director, producer and television writer. He also earned a nomination for the Genie Award for Best Motion Picture for Saint Ralph. He is the Executive Producer and Co-President of Amaze Film and Television.

External links
 

Canadian film producers
Canadian television directors
Canadian television producers
Canadian television writers
Living people
Year of birth missing (living people)
Place of birth missing (living people)